Iván Navarro was the defender of championship title, but he lost to Marco Chiudinelli in the quarterfinal.
Karol Beck won in the final 6–4, 6–3, against Thiago Alves.

It took place in Pozoblanco, Spain between 6 and 12 July 2009.

Seeds

Draw

Final four

Top half

Bottom half

References
 Main draw
 Qualifying draw

Singles
2009